Lewis Taylor is the first album by the British neo-soul composer and multi-instrumentalist Lewis Taylor, released in 1996.

Track listing
All songs are composed and written by Lewis Taylor except where indicated.
"Lucky" (Lewis Taylor/Sabina Smyth) – 6:34
"Bittersweet" – 5:36
"Whoever" – 4:30
"Track" (Lewis Taylor/Sabina Smyth) – 5:11
"Song" (Lewis Taylor/Sabina Smyth) – 4:56
"Betterlove" – 5:24
"How" – 3:59
"Right" – 4:27
"Damn" (Lewis Taylor/Sabina Smyth) – 6:04
"Spirit" – 3:15
Japanese edition bonus tracks
"I Dream the Better Dream"
"Waves"

References

1996 albums
Lewis Taylor albums